Allocasuarina inophloia, also known as woolly oak, or stringybark she-oak, is a shrub or small tree of the she-oak family Casuarinaceae endemic to inland New South Wales and Queensland. The hairy bark is an unusual feature.

Taxonomy
First collected near Roma in central Queensland, the stringybark she-oak was described by  Ferdinand von Mueller and Frederick Manson Bailey in 1882 as Casuarina inophloia. Exactly 100 years later, Lawrie Johnson moved it to its current genus Allocasuarina in his revision of the she-oaks.

Description
It is dioecious. Like all she-oaks, its foliage is composed of segmented branchlets with segments known as articles, its leaves reduced to tiny scales between them.

Distribution and habitat
In New South Wales it occurs in areas such as the Clarence River valley, Emmaville, Yetman, south to Waralda, while it ranges in Queensland north to Herberton. It is found in woodland on sandstone, ironstone or laterite ridges. Associated species include grasstrees (Xanthorrhoea) and eucalypts, such as  drooping ironbark (Eucalyptus caleyi).

Northwest of Glen Innes it is found in tall scrub on granitic soil uplands with other dominant species such as the she-oak species Allocasuarina brachystachya, wattle species Acacia williamsiana and the endangered Severn River heath-myrtle (Micromyrtus grandis) and understory shrubs such as Leucopogon neo-anglicus and fringe myrtle (Calytrix tetragona).

It has been recorded as a host plant for the orange mistletoe (Dendrophthoe glabrescens).

Cultivation
Its shaggy bark gives the species its horticultural potential. It is frost hardy and able to tolerate poor soils.

References

Fagales of Australia
inophloia
Flora of New South Wales
Flora of Queensland
Trees of Australia
Plants described in 1882
Taxa named by Ferdinand von Mueller
Taxa named by Frederick Manson Bailey
Dioecious plants